The Convention for the Renewal of the Comoros (CRC) is a political party in the Comoros.

History
The CRC was established in September 2002 by members of the Movement for Socialism and Democracy, a group expelled from the Democratic Front. In the 2004 parliamentary elections the party won six of the 18 elected seats, becoming the only opposition to the Camp of the Autonomous Islands alliance.

The party won two seats in the 2015 parliamentary elections, taken by Ali Mhadji and Charif Maoulana.

In January 2020, the Legislative elections in Comoros were dominated by President Azali Assoumani’s party, the Convention for the Renewal of Comoros, CRC. It took an overwhelming majority in the parliament and his hold on power strengthened.  CRC won 17 out of 24 legislative seats.

References

Political parties in the Comoros
Political parties established in 2002
2002 establishments in the Comoros